The 2013 Chang-Sat Bangkok Open was a professional tennis tournament played on hard courts. It was the fifth edition of the tournament which was part of the 2013 ATP Challenger Tour. It took place in Bangkok, Thailand between 26 August and 1 September 2013.

Singles main-draw entrants

Seeds

 1 Rankings are as of August 20, 2013.

Other entrants
The following players received wildcards into the singles main draw:
  Phassawit Burapharitta
  Chayanon Kaewsuto
  Warit Sornbutnark
  Kittipong Wachiramanowong

The following players received entry from the qualifying draw:
  Tyler Hochwalt
  Temur Ismailov
  Karunuday Singh
  Wishaya Trongcharoenchaikul

The following players received entry as a lucky loser into the main draw:
  Punn Bodhidatta
  Sanjar Fayziev

Champions

Singles

  Blaž Kavčič def.  Jeong Suk-young 6–3, 6–1

Doubles

 Chen Ti /  Huang Liang-chi def.  Jeong Suk-young /  Nam Ji-sung 6–3, 6–2

External links
Official Website

 
 ATP Challenger Tour
Tennis, ATP Challenger Tour, Chang-Sat Bangkok Open
Tennis, ATP Challenger Tour, Chang-Sat Bangkok Open

Tennis, ATP Challenger Tour, Chang-Sat Bangkok Open
Tennis, ATP Challenger Tour, Chang-Sat Bangkok Open